Papago Army Heliport  is a United States Army heliport at Papago Park Military Reservation. It is home to the 2nd Battalion, 285th Aviation Regiment.

Although most U.S. airports use the same three-letter location identifier for the FAA, IATA, and ICAO, this airport is only assigned P18 by the FAA.

Facilities and aircraft 
It has one asphalt helipad:
 12/30 measuring

References

External links 
 Arizona Army National Guard at Papago Park
 285th Attack Reconnaissance Battalion
 

Airports in Maricopa County, Arizona